The Central Avenue station is a station on the BMT Myrtle Avenue Line of the New York City Subway. Located at Myrtle Avenue and Cedar Street in Bushwick, Brooklyn, it is served by the M train at all times.

History
The Myrtle Avenue Line was built and operated by the Union Elevated Railroad Company. The first section of the line opened in 1888, and it was extended from Broadway to Wyckoff Avenue on July 20, 1889.

This station was rehabilitated from March to August 2013. On July 1, 2017, the station was closed again until April 30, 2018, as part of the reconstruction of the Myrtle Avenue Line's junction with the BMT Jamaica Line.

Station layout

This elevated station has two side platforms and two tracks with space for a center track, which was removed by 1946.

The Queens-bound platform has brown canopies with green frames and support columns for the entire length except for small sections at either ends. A small section in the center below the canopy has beige windscreens while the rest of the platform has black, waist-high, steel fences. The Manhattan-bound platform has the same layout as the Queens-bound one except that the entire canopied portion has beige windscreens.

Exits
This station has one elevated station house beneath the platforms and tracks at the east end, though extra beams on the elevated structure suggests that another station house formerly existed at the west end. A single staircase from each platform goes down to a waiting area/crossunder, where a turnstile bank provides access to and from the station. Outside fare control, there is a token booth and two staircases going down to the southwest and northwest corners of Myrtle Avenue and Cedar Street. Only the northern staircase has a canopy above it.

References

External links 
 
 
 Station Reporter — M Train
 The Subway Nut — Central Avenue Pictures 
 Cedar Street entrance from Google Maps Street View
 Platforms from Google Maps Street View

BMT Myrtle Avenue Line stations
New York City Subway stations in Brooklyn
Railway stations in the United States opened in 1889
Bushwick, Brooklyn